Knuckle is a 2011 Irish documentary film about the secretive world of Irish Traveller bare-knuckle boxing. The film was made in stages over 12 years. The film premiered at the 2011 Sundance Film Festival. This film follows a history of violent feuding between rival clans.

Synopsis
This film follows 12 years in the lives of three Irish Traveller families (Joyces, Nevins, and Quinn-McDonaghs) and their bitter feuds and fights. The film explores the reasons why they hold these fights and explores in-depth these families' secret life, which is barely known to outsiders of the Traveller community. The real reason for the feud among the families is never revealed, as they will not talk about it to outsiders.

Cast
 James Quinn McDonagh 
 Michael Quinn McDonagh
 Paddy Quinn McDonagh
 Christy (Ditsy) Walford
 Thomas (Spike) Nevin
 Ian Palmer
 Davey Nevin
 Joe (Big Joe) Joyce

Reception
The film received a mostly positive response from critics. 
On Rotten Tomatoes it has an approval rating of 93% based on reviews from 43 critics.

See also
 List of Irish Traveller-related depictions and documentaries

References

External links
 

2011 films
2011 documentary films
2010s sports films
British documentary films
Bare-knuckle boxing
Documentary films about boxing
Films scored by Ilan Eshkeri
Films shot in the Republic of Ireland
Irish documentary films
English-language Irish films
2010s English-language films
2010s British films